Scardovia wiggsiae is a species of bacterium in the family Bifidobacteriaceae. In 2011, a study carried out using anaerobic culture conditions allowed the identification of a newly named species, Scardovia wiggsiae [], which was significantly associated with severe ECC (Early childhood caries,  a particularly severe manifestation of carious pathology affecting children between birth and 71 months of age). The paper of Bossù et al. 2020 [] shows that S. wiggsiae forms biofilm and illustrates for the first time with high resolution scanning electron microscopy images the morphology of this bacterium and its biofilm.  Images were obtained usingn original scanning electron microscopy protocol, the OsO4-RR-TA-IL treatment. The biofilm had  an intricate three-dimensional architecture made of Eps trabeculae, in this structure a complex micro-canalicular system was developed. S. wiggsiae has the aspect of an elongated bacterium, without pili or fimbriae. It forms clusters of bacteria embedded in the Eps scaffold.

References

Bacteria described in 2011
Bifidobacteriales